B4U Music is an Indian Hindi music channel owned by the B4U Network Limited.

The channel broadcasts a mixture of contemporary Bollywood, Indipop, Bhangra and international music. Programs include celebrity interviews, artist profiles, concerts and chart rundowns, as well as video request shows.

There are four different versions of the channel being broadcast in the UK, North America, Africa, the Middle East and South Asia. Each feed produces a quantity of local programming which reflects the culture and tastes of the local population of the Indian diaspora and new logo on 12.12.2020.

Since 2008, the yearly UK Asian Music Awards have been produced and broadcast by the channel.

Recognition 
B4U Music emerged as the No.1 Asian TV channel in UK ratings in January 2022.

See also
 ATN B4U Music

References

External links
 

Television stations in Mumbai
Music video networks in the United Kingdom
Indian pop
Television channels and stations established in 1999
British Indian mass media
Music television channels
1999 establishments in Maharashtra

Music television channels in India